Elisabeth Moore won the singles tennis title of the 1903 U.S. Women's National Singles Championship by defeating reigning champion Marion Jones 7–5, 8–6 in the challenge round. Moore had won the right to challenge Jones by defeating Carrie Neely 6–2, 6–4 in the final of the All Comers' competition. The event was played on outdoor grass courts and held at the Philadelphia Cricket Club in Wissahickon Heights, Chestnut Hill, Philadelphia, from June 24 through June 27, 1903.

Draw

Challenge round

All Comers' finals

References

1903
1903 in American women's sports
June 1903 sports events
Women's Singles
1903 in women's tennis
Chestnut Hill, Philadelphia
1900s in Philadelphia
1903 in sports in Pennsylvania
Women's sports in Pennsylvania